The French title of duc de Plaisance (English: Duke of Piacenza) was created on 24 April 1808 by Napoleon I for Charles-François Lebrun, Arch-Treasurer of the Empire and former Consul. The title became extinct in 1926, upon the death of the sixth duke.

List of ducs de Plaisance 
 1808-1824 : Charles-François Lebrun (1739-1824), 1st duc de Plaisance.
 1824-1859 : Anne Charles Lebrun (1775-1859), 2nd duc de Plaisance, son of the preceding.
 1859-1872 : Charles Louis Alexandre Jules Lebrun (1811-1872), 3rd duc de Plaisance, nephew of the preceding. 
 1872-1907 : Louis Armand Joseph de Maillé de La Tour-Landry (1860-1907), 4th duc de Plaisance, maternal great-grandson of the 1st Duke.
 1907-1913 : Armand Louis Joseph François de Maillé de La Tour-Landry (1892-1913), 5th duc de Plaisance, son of the preceding.
 1913-1926 : François Charles Edmond Marie de Maillé de La Tour-Landry (1862-1926), 6th duc de Plaisance, uncle of the preceding, title extinct upon his death.

Dukes of the First French Empire
Noble titles created in 1808